Japan's hydrogen highway is a network of hydrogen filling stations placed along roadsides that provide fuel for hydrogen fuel cell vehicles (HFCV). An HFCV is a vehicle that uses a fuel cell to convert hydrogen energy into electrical energy. The hydrogen that is used in fuel cell vehicles can be made using fossil or renewable resources. The hydrogen highway is necessary for HFCVs to be used. HFCV reduce tailpipe emissions of greenhouse gases. By May 2016, there were approximately 80 hydrogen fueling stations in Japan.

Japanese hydrogen powered cars
Since 2014, Toyota and Honda have begun to introduce Fuel Cell Vehicles (FCV) that convert hydrogen into electricity while only emitting water vapor at the tailpipe. FCV sales are limited by the need for a Hydrogen supply infrastructure network. This network's purpose would be to make the purchase of hydrogen powered vehicles more appealing to the public.

Development
The first two hydrogen fueling stations were built for the Japan Hydrogen and Fuel Cell Demonstration Project (JHFC) Expo, to promote the usage of hydrogen fuel, in March 2005. The fuel stations were displayed in two different sides in the city of Seto (Seto-North and Seto-South). This Expo for introducing hydrogen fuel cell technology proved effective as over 1,300 kg of fuel was dispensed from the stations. At the end of 2012 there where 17 hydrogen stations. 

The Japanese government planned to add up to 100 public hydrogen stations under a budget of 460 million dollars covering 50% of the installation costs with the last ones hoped to be operational in 2015. JX Energy expected to install 40 stations by 2015.  Toho Gas and Iwatani Corp expected to install an additional 20 stations. Toyota Tsusho and Air Liquide made a JV to build 2 hydrogen stations hoped to be ready by 2015.  A "task force" led by Yuriko Koike, Japan's former environment minister, and supported by the country's Liberal Democratic Party was set up to guide the process.

By May 2016, there were approximately 80 hydrogen fueling stations in Japan.

Creators of the JHFC
The members from the government branch are
 Ministry of Economy, Trade and Industry
 Agency of Natural Resources and Energy
 Ministry of Land, Infrastructure and Transport (MLIT)
Member from a semi-governmental organization
 New Energy and Industrial Technology Development
Member of Public Research
 National Institute of Advanced Industrial Science and Technology
Member of Private Firm
 Fuel Cell Commercialization Conference of Japan

Reasons for Japan's investment in fuel cells
The two motivations for the research and development of fuel cells were because of the energy policy and the industrial policy.
 Energy policy
 Create/Find a new source of renewable energy
      Stay technologically competitive with other companies
      Many countries are seeing how efficient Fuel Cells are which is why Japan seeks to expand their investments in the Fuel Cell industry
       Environmental Issues
 Slow climate change
      Japan, like the rest of the world, seeks to reduce green house gas emissions by using "safer" forms of energy.
 Industrial policy
 Maintain a competitive economy through advanced technology
      Fuel cells are profitable, being well invested in such and industry will give Japan an advantage economically speaking

Supporters
The cost of these Hydrogen gas stations is not cheap so there are many car and oil companies that are supporting this transition. There are 13 main companies that are paying for the new source of fuel.
 Toyota Motor Corporation (TMC)
 Nissan Motor Company
 Honda Motor Company
 JX Nippon Oil & Energy Corporation
 Idemitsu Kosan Company
 Iwatani Corporation
 Osaka Gas Company
 Cosmo Oil Company
 Saibu Gas Company
 Showa Shell Sekiyu K.K.
 Taiyo Nippon Sanso Corporation
 Tokyo Gas Company
 Toho Gas Company

References

Roads in Japan
Hydrogen infrastructure
Hydrogen economy
Highways